Black & White is a 2009 Taiwanese drama starring Vic Chou, Mark Chao, Ivy Chen and Janine Chang. It was produced by Prajna Works and directed by Cai Yuexun (蔡岳勳) with location filming in Kaohsiung, Taiwan.

The series was first broadcast in Taiwan on free-to-air Public Television Service (PTS) (公視) from 11 April 2009 to 27 June 2009 and on satellite TV channel TVBS Joy Channel, from 18 April 2009 to 3 July 2009.

The drama was nominated in 2009 for 11 awards at the 44th annual Golden Bell Awards, winning 5: Best Television Series, Best Actor for Mark Chao, Best Directing for a Television Series for Cai Yuexun, Best Art and Design for a Television Series, and Best Marketing Program.

Two prequel films centering around Chao's character, titled Black & White Episode I: The Dawn of Assault and Black & White: The Dawn of Justice, were released in 2012 and 2014 respectively.

Cast
Vic Chou as Shrek (Pi Zi) 陳在天 (南區分局長)
Mark Chao as Wu Ying Xiong (吳英雄)
Janine Chang as Lan Xi Ying (藍西英)
Allen Chao as South District Director (南區分局長)
Tang Zhi Wei as Chen Jun Lin (陳俊麟)
Chien Te-men as Li Jian Guo (Lao Li) 李建國 (老李)
Hong Chen Ying (洪晨穎) as Ai Lu (Xiao Lu) 艾綠 (小綠)
Hank Wu as Hao Ke (浩克)
Chen You Fang as Ling Wen Qi (凌文琦)
Chin Shih-chieh as Shi Yong Guang (石永光)
Zhang Fu Jian as Fan Tian Cheng (范天誠)
Sonia Sui as Lei Mu Sha (雷慕莎)
Tao Chuan Zheng as Defense secretary
Kao Ying Hsuan as Senator's assistant
Jag Huang as Wu Yang (吳洋)
Fan Kuang-yao as Sergeant Huang
Zhou Kai Wen (周凱文) as Detective
Chang Han as Detective
Lin Jia You (林家佑) as Detective
Che Guan Cheng (車冠成) as Detective
Huang Lu Wen (黃綠文) as Forensic Specialist
Lai Zhen Ze (賴震澤) as Forensic Specialist
Lin Yi Qian (林伊蒨) as Police
Tang Zhen (唐臻) as Police
Qiu Rong Sheng (丘瑢升) as Lieutenant
Xu Bo Qiang (許柏強) as Uniformed police
Lin Ju Xian (林均憲) as Uniformed police

SanLianHui

Ivy Chen as Chen Lin 陳琳
Paul Chun as Lao Tou 老頭
Na Wei Xun as Du Wen Yan 杜文雁
Tang Guo Zhong (唐國忠) as Che Jin 車進

Others in SanLianHui

Kurt Chou as A Tang 阿唐
Kageyama Yukihiko (蔭山征彥) as A De 阿得
Derrick Chang as An Zai 安仔
Liu Kai Rong (劉開容) as An's brother
Bu Xue Liang as Logistics manager
Huang Tai An 
Wu Xiang Zhen(吳翔震)
Huang Ding Jun (黃鼎鈞)
Cheng Bo Ren(陳柏仁)
Wu ming Lun (吳明倫)
Shao Fu (少甫)
Zheng Wen Hong (鄭文宏)
Zou Zhong Xian (鄒仲賢)
Liu Yi Ru (劉翼儒)
Li Wei De (李威得)

Other Lawless

Kingone Wang as Gao Yi 高義
Irene Hsu as Cheng Yuan 程願
Jason Zou as Cheng Nuo 程諾

Sarkozy

Jimmy Hung (洪天祥) as BOSS
Huang Wen Xuan as P
Benji as G
Eric as F
Yang Xiu Wen (楊琇雯) as K
Ou Si Ka (奧斯卡) as O
A Liang as M

The Civilians

Xiu Jie Kai as Ma Xiao Ming 馬小明 / Huang Shi Kai 黃世楷 / Q
Reen Yu as He Xiao Mei 何小玫
Patina Lin as Ling Ke Le 凌可樂
Lu Yi Jing (陸奕靜) as An's mother
Zhao Zi Qiang (趙自強) as Attorney Hong
Bao Zheng Fang (鮑正芳) as Ying Xiong's mother
Renzo Liu as Jian Da De 簡大德
Xiao Call (小Call) as Tian Mi Mi 田蜜蜜
Li Lu (李律)
Luo Mei Ling (羅美玲)

International broadcast
In February 2013, Malaysia's television station TV2 began broadcasting the series. In December 2021, the series began streaming on Netflix.

Awards and nominations
2009 - 44th Golden Bell Awards (金鐘獎), Taiwan.
 Awarded: Black & White for Best Television Series
 Nominated: Vic Chou for Best Actor
 Awarded: Mark Chao for Best Actor
 Nominated: Kingone Wang for Best Supporting Actor
 Awarded: Cai Yuexun (蔡岳勳) for Best Directing for a Television Series (Golden Bell Awards)|Best Directing for a Television Series
 Nominated: Wu Luo Ying (吳絡纓), Chen Hui Ru (陳慧如) for Best Writing for a Television Series
 Nominated: Carrie Recording Studio for Best Sound for a Television Series
 Nominated: Ceng Kai Lun for Best Lighting for a Television Series
 Awarded: 郭臻鈺、Olivia Hsi-Pin CHEN(陳昕蘋)、戴德偉 for Best Art and Design for a Television Series
 Awarded: Black & White for Best Best Marketing Programme
 Nominated: Black & White for Best Channel Advertisement for a Television Series

See also
Black & White Episode I: The Dawn of Assault
Black & White: The Dawn of Justice

References

External links
 Prajna Works homepage
 Black & White PTS homepage
 Black & White CTS homepage

2009 Taiwanese television series debuts
2009 Taiwanese television series endings
Taiwanese drama television series
Public Television Service original programming
Television shows written by Luo Ying Wu
Television shows adapted into films